The Church of Our Lady of Fatima is a Roman Catholic parish church in the neighbourhood of Pocitos, Montevideo, Uruguay.

The parish was established on 1 May 1954. The temple is dedicated to the Virgin of Fatima. It is held by the Claretians, who also run the adjacent private school Colegio y Liceo Nuestra Señora de Fátima (established 1960). Originally the celebrations were held in a crypt under the school; the current temple was built in the early 1980s, in brickwork.

Same devotion
There are other churches in Uruguay dedicated to Our Lady of Fatima:
 Parish Church of Our Lady of Fatima in Villa del Cerro
 Fatima Chapel in Punta del Este
 Parish Church of Our Lady of Fatima in Rocha
 Our Lady of Fatima Chapel in Colonia Valdense
 Our Lady of Fatima Parish Church in Minas
 Our Lady of Fatima Parish Church in San José de Mayo

References

-

Pocitos, Montevideo
1954 establishments in Uruguay

Roman Catholic church buildings in Montevideo
Claretian churches in Uruguay
20th-century Roman Catholic church buildings in Uruguay